Elspeth MacGregor Cameron (born 10 January 1943) is a Canadian writer best known for her biographies of noted Canadian literary figures such as Irving Layton and Earle Birney. She is also noted for her 1997 memoir No Previous Experience, a memoir of her process of self-discovery when, having previously identified as heterosexual, she began to develop a sexual and romantic attraction to historian Janice Dickin McGinnis. She has also published a volume of poetry.

She lives in St. Catharines, Ontario. Cameron has taught at Concordia University, the University of Toronto and Brock University.

Awards
Her biography of Hugh MacLennan, Hugh MacLennan: A Writer's Life, was nominated for the Governor General's Award for English-language non-fiction at the 1981 Governor General's Awards. No Previous Experience won the W. O. Mitchell Literary Prize.

Bibliography
Hugh MacLennan: A Writer's Life (1981)
A Spider Danced A Cosy Jig (1984)
Irving Layton: A Portrait (1985)
Robertson Davies: An Appreciation (1991)
Earle Birney: A Life (1994)
Great Dames (1997)
No Previous Experience: A Memoir of Love and Change (1997)
And Beauty Answers: The Life of Frances Loring and Florence Wyle (2007)
Aunt Winnie (2013)

External links

References

1943 births

Canadian biographers
Canadian women non-fiction writers
Canadian people of Scottish descent
Canadian LGBT writers
Living people
People from St. Catharines
Women biographers
Writers from Ontario